Leona Elaine Winona DaVinna (April 17, 1920 – November 17, 2020), known professionally as Kay Morley, was an American actress who worked in Hollywood in the 1940s and 1950s. She was primarily known for her work in B movies.

Morley died on November 17, 2020, at her home in Palm Springs, California, aged 100.

Biography 
Leona Elaine Winona DaVinna was born on April 17, 1920, in Pocatello, Idaho, and she spent her childhood on a Native American reservation where her father was superintendent. She later recounted that she was visiting a friend in Hollywood when she was spotted by an agent at a soda counter.

Morley got her start in Hollywood as a Goldwyn glamour girl. She appeared in a series of films in the 1940s, including Up in Arms and The Princess and the Pirate. In the 1950s, she worked mostly in television. 

She was married twice: to actor Richard Crane and to Lloyd Baird. She and Crane had at least one child together.

Selected filmography 

 Sealed Cargo (1951)
 Trails End (1949)
 Outlaw Brand (1948)
 Letter from an Unknown Woman (1948)
 Campus Honeymoon (1948)
 Secret Beyond the Door... (1947)
 Code of the Saddle (1947)
 Six-Gun Serenade (1947)
 Betty Co-Ed (1946)
 It's a Pleasure (1945)
 The Princess and the Pirate (1944)
 Youth Aflame (1944)
 Show Business (1944)
 Up in Arms (1944)

References

External links

1920 births
American centenarians
American film actresses
Actresses from Idaho
People from Pocatello, Idaho
Women centenarians
2020 deaths
21st-century American women